Athol may refer to:

Places

Scotland
 Atholl, Scotland, a district in central Scotland

Canada
 Athol, Nova Scotia, a small community
 Athol, Prince Edward County, Ontario, a municipality and census division
 Athol, a rural community in North Glengarry, Ontario

United States
 Athol, Idaho, a city
 Athol, Kansas, a city
 Athol, Kentucky, an unincorporated community
 Athol, Massachusetts, a town
 Athol (CDP), Massachusetts, a census-designated place within the town
 Athol, original name of Thurman, New York, a town
 Athol, South Dakota, an unincorporated community

Elsewhere
 Athol, Queensland, Australia, a rural locality
 Athol, New Zealand, a town
 Athol Island, Bahamas

Buildings
 Athol (Henderson, Maryland), a home on the National Register of Historic Places (NRHP)
 Athol (Simpsonville, Maryland), a historic plantation house
 Athol (Edenton, North Carolina), a plantation house on the NRHP
 Athol Manor, Columbia, Maryland

People
 Athol (given name)

See also

Atholl (disambiguation)
Atoll (disambiguation)